Christopher Mazdzer (born June 26, 1988) is an American luger. He competed at the 2010 Winter Olympics in Vancouver and the 2014 Winter Olympics in Sochi, finishing 13th on both occasions. At the 2018 Winter Olympics Mazdzer won the silver medal in the Men's Single Luge, becoming the first U.S. men's singles luge medalist and the first and  only non-European to win a medal in that event.

Career
On December 4, 2015, Mazdzer won the 2015–16 Luge World Cup Men's singles event at Lake Placid in the first-ever one-two finish for the United States in a men's singles luge World Cup event, with the 2014–15 winner and track record holder, Tucker West, coming in second. Until his 2015 win, Mazdzer's best finish at the FIL World Luge Championships was sixth in the singles at Whistler, British Columbia, in 2013. His best World Cup season finish was 13th in 2012–13.  In December 2014, he won the men's singles event in the luge sprint in the second ever to be held and to be competed in event at the World Cup level in the discipline.  Mazdzer was therein victorious at the FIL "Sprint" World Cup event at the Calgary track.

On February 11, 2018, Mazdzer won a silver medal at the 2018 Winter Olympics in Pyeongchang.

Dancing with the Stars
In April 2018, Mazdzer was announced as one of the celebrities for season 26 of Dancing with the Stars. He was partnered with professional dancer Witney Carson. He was eliminated in the third week of the four-week season, placing fourth in the competition.

Personal life
Mazdzer's hometown is Saranac Lake, New York.  Mazdzer met his Romanian-born wife, Mara, in the summer of 2017 and they became engaged in October 2019; they were married in Salt Lake City, Utah, on May 19, 2020.

References

External links

1988 births
American male lugers
Living people
Lugers at the 2010 Winter Olympics
Lugers at the 2014 Winter Olympics
Lugers at the 2018 Winter Olympics
Lugers at the 2022 Winter Olympics
Olympic lugers of the United States
Sportspeople from Pittsfield, Massachusetts
People from Saranac Lake, New York
Olympic silver medalists for the United States in luge
Medalists at the 2018 Winter Olympics
DeVry University alumni